"Be Your Shadow" is a song by Liverpudlian indie band The Wombats. It was the fourth single to be released from their third album Glitterbug. The music video premiered on Soccer AM on May 23. Following on from the pattern of Glitterbugs previous singles, "Be Your Shadow" does not have any B-sides.

Track listing

References

2015 singles
The Wombats songs
2014 songs
14th Floor Records singles
Songs written by Matthew Murphy
Songs written by Tord Øverland Knudsen
Songs written by Dan Haggis